Gairloch is a village and sea-loch on the north-west coast of Scotland.

Gairloch may also refer to:

 Gairloch, Queensland, a locality on the Bruce Highway in the Shire of Hinchinbrook, Australia
 Gairloch Bridge, a heritage-listed road bridge over the Herbert River near Ingham in Queensland, Australia

See also
 Gair Loch, a sea-loch on the north-west coast of Scotland
Gair Loch, a river loch on the Seaforth River in New Zealand
 Gare Loch, a sea-loch in Argyle and Bute, Scotland
 Gairlochy, a hamlet in the North West Highlands of Scotland
 Lochgair, a village on the north-western shore of Loch Fyne, Scotland
 New Gairlock, Nova Scotia, a community in the province of Nova Scotia, Canada